Polerady may refer to the following locations in the Czech Republic:

 Polerady (Most District), a village
 Polerady (Prague-East District), a village